Fryanovo is an urban locality (an urban-type settlement) in Shchyolkovsky District of Moscow Oblast, Russia. Population:  It has grown up around a silk factory which was established in 1735 by the Armenian Lazaryan family.

References

Urban-type settlements in Moscow Oblast